A claw hammer is a type of hammer.

Claw hammer or Clawhammer may also refer to:

Clawhammer, a style of banjo playing
Claw Hammer, an indie rock band active 1986–2000
"Claw Hammer", a song from Elton John's 2016 album Wonderful Crazy Night
Athlon 64, a microprocessor released 2003, also called Clawhammer